The Mammal Society is a British charity devoted to the research and conservation of British mammals.

The Mammal Society was formed in 1954, and the inaugural spring conference took place the following year at The University of Exeter.

The Mammal Society has a membership of around 2000 mammalogists, ecologists, conservationists, both experts and enthusiasts, all working to develop greater understanding of mammals and the conservation challenges they face. The Society runs national surveys for mammals, for example Mini Mammal Monitoring.

The Mammal Society is also working to address the problem that mammals in the British Isles are severely under-recorded, resulting in a lack of mammal conservation progress. The Mammal Society is determined to overcome this by creating a National Mammal Atlas to provide vital information on mammal distribution and abundance so that informed conservation decisions can be made for species in need. In order to achieve this they are collating national mammal data and records to gather up to date information.

The Mammal Society offers a wide range of expert-led training courses for consultants, conservationists and enthusiasts alike, covering ecology, technical skills and surveying.

The Society's president is Penny Lewns, and its current Chair is Dr Stephanie Wray.

Publications 

The Mammal Society publishes a number of informative books for conservationists, enthusiasts and consultants alike, as well as a high impact scientific journal, Mammal Review.

In June 2012, The Mammal Society published UK BAP Mammals: Interim Guidelines for Survey Methodologies, Impact Assessment & Mitigation  for species for which there was previously no available guidance.

The definitive publication of The Mammal Society is the 4th edition of Mammals of The British Isles Handbook. The Handbook is well established as the classic reference source detailing the biology, ecology and conservation of every mammal occurring in Britain and Ireland. The 3rd edition, dating to 1991, had long been out of press, until over 100 of the leading mammalogists, mostly members of The Mammal Society, contributed to complete this comprehensive 800-page 4th revision, published in 2008. It presents an authoritative summary of our current knowledge of mammal ecology, biology and conservation issues, with detailed accounts for every species of mammal found in or around the British Isles.

http://mammal.org.uk/handbook

External links

References 

British biology societies
Conservation in the United Kingdom
Environmental organisations based in the United Kingdom
1954 establishments in the United Kingdom
Scientific organizations established in 1954